Mikaelar Whippy (born March 31, 1986) is a female basketball player from Fiji who played for the Fiji women's national basketball team at the FIBA World Olympic Qualifying Tournament for Women 2008.

Personal
She was born in Suva, Fiji on March 31, 1986. She attended the Church College of New Zealand, a secondary school in Temple View, Hamilton, New Zealand before pursuing a college basketball career in the U.S. at Long Island University. At LIU, she majored in economics with a minor in accounting. Upon her graduation in 2008, she assumed the role of director of operations for women's basketball at LIU for the following two seasons and earned her master's degree in human resource management in 2010.

College career
At Long Island University, Whippy was a four-year starter and a two-year captain for the Blackbirds. Over her college career she averaged 8.2 points per game, totaling 952 points, 16th in school history.  She pulled down 416 rebounds and is fifth all-time in assists with 285 total assists, averaging 2.5 per game. She sunk 40% of her 2-point shots and made 31% of her 3-point attempts.

LIU  Brooklyn statistics 
Source

International career
In 2008, Whippy became a member of the Fiji National Team and participated in the FIBA Olympic Qualifying tournament.

References

External links
 Fiji National Team australiabasket.com

1986 births
Living people
Sportspeople from Suva
Fijian people of I-Taukei Fijian descent
Fijian people of British descent
Fijian women's basketball players
LIU Brooklyn Blackbirds women's basketball players
Fijian expatriate basketball people in the United States